Alison Elizabeth Larter (born February 28, 1976) is an American actress and model. She portrayed fictional model Allegra Coleman in a 1996 Esquire magazine hoax and took on guest roles on several television shows in the 1990s. She made her film debut in Varsity Blues (1999), which was followed by the horror film House on Haunted Hill (1999). Her role as Clear Rivers in the first two films of the Final Destination franchise earned her a reputation as a scream queen. 

Larter played supporting roles in the comedy Legally Blonde (2001) and the romantic comedy A Lot Like Love (2005), and led the Bollywood movie Marigold (2007) and the thriller Obsessed (2009). She played the dual roles of Niki Sanders and Tracy Strauss on the NBC science fiction drama Heroes (2006–2010), and achieved wider recognition for her portrayal of video game heroine Claire Redfield in the Resident Evil: Extinction (2007), Resident Evil: Afterlife (2010), and Resident Evil: The Final Chapter (2016).

As of April 2017, Larter's films have grossed over US$1.31 billion worldwide. Her presence in the media is reinforced by her appearances in lists compiled by Maxim, FHM, and Stuff, as well as People magazine's "Best Dressed List" in 2007. She released her cookbook, Kitchen Revelry: A Year of Festive Menus from My Home to Yours, in September 2013.

Early life
Larter was born in the suburb of Cherry Hill, New Jersey, the daughter of Margaret, a realtor, and Danforth Larter, a trucking executive. She attended Carusi Middle School and later graduated from Cherry Hill High School West during her time as a model, but she didn't finish her senior year of high school because of modeling. Her mom accompanied her everywhere until she turned 18. Her parents have since moved to Allentown, Pennsylvania. Larter said she was a tomboy until she turned 13.

Career

Early modeling work (1990–1998)
She began her modeling career at the age of 14 when a modeling scout discovered her on the street and was asked to star in a Phillies commercial; this led to a modeling contract with the prestigious Ford Modeling Agency in New York. Larter subsequently skipped her senior year to model in Australia, Italy, and Japan, the latter a country she would temporarily settle in at the age of seventeen. While modeling in Italy, Larter met fellow model and aspiring actress Amy Smart and the two "became instant friends", according to Larter.

In November 1996, Larter portrayed fictional actress Allegra Coleman in an Esquire magazine hoax. When speaking about the cover and her subsequent fame, Larter said, "When the door opens for you in Hollywood, you need to run with it. You know?" Larter is currently signed to IMG Models. She landed her first professional acting roles in 1997 when she appeared in several television programs. She appeared in an episode of the Brooke Shields television series Suddenly Susan, and the short-lived series Chicago Sons. These roles were followed by a number of other appearances on Dawson's Creek, Chicago Hope, and Just Shoot Me!

Acting debut and breakthrough (1999–2005) 
In 1999, Larter made her film debut in the coming-of-age dramedy Varsity Blues, which re-united her with Dawson's Creek star James Van Der Beek and close friend Amy Smart. Smart had persuaded Larter to audition for the movie, in which she played Darcy Sears, a love interest for one of the main characters. Varsity Blues drew a domestic box office gross of US$53 million. Also in 1999, she made supporting appearances in the teen comedies Giving It Up and Drive Me Crazy, and starred in the remake House on Haunted Hill which was made for around US$20 million. The horror film, following a group of strangers invited to a party at an abandoned asylum, was panned by critics, but grossed US$15 million on its opening weekend and went on to earn over US$40 million overall.

Larter starred as Clear Rivers, one of the main characters in the teen supernatural horror film Final Destination (2000). Also starring Devon Sawa and Kerr Smith, the movie's premise followed several teenagers who survive a plane crash but are stalked and killed by Death itself. Final Destination made US$112 million by the end of its theatrical run. In 2001, she appeared in the comedy Legally Blonde with Reese Witherspoon. She played Brooke Taylor Windham, a widow accused of her husband's murder. The film earned the top spot with US$20 million in its opening weekend and ended up grossing $141 million worldwide. With US$96 million of its total gross deriving from domestic markets, Legally Blonde is Larter's highest-grossing film domestically.

Larter next appeared as Zerelda Mimms in the western comedy American Outlaws. Directed by Les Mayfield and co-starring Colin Farrell and Scott Caan, the film was poorly received by critics and at the box office, garnering US$13 million at the end of its theatrical run. She also starred in Kevin Smith's Jay and Silent Bob Strike Back. That year, Larter appeared on the cover of Maxim magazine and performed in the stage play The Vagina Monologues in New York City. In Spring 2002, Larter moved from Los Angeles to New York. "I was too young and impressionable to handle the pressures of L.A." Larter recalled in an interview: "I'm a woman now. I am no longer the little girl who could be easily influenced."

Her first project there was to reprise her role as Clear Rivers in the sequel to Final Destination entitled Final Destination 2. In an interview with IGN, Larter explained her return to the franchise: "When New Line asked me to come back, I thought it was great. They showed me the script and let me have some input, and it was really terrific." The film made US$90 million worldwide, to a mixed critical reception. A year later, Larter served as an associate producer of and starred in the thriller Three Way. After doing so, Larter commented about future producing endeavors during an interview for Resident Evil: Extinction: "I definitely have many ideas and different avenues that I want to take as my career goes on." In 2005, she appeared in the independent political thriller Confess, and had a role in the romantic comedy A Lot Like Love, starring Amanda Peet and Ashton Kutcher.

Rise to prominence and subsequent hiatus (2006–2011)

Larter moved back to Los Angeles in 2005. Her first audition was for the NBC science fiction drama television series Heroes. Larter played the characters of Niki Sanders, who suffered from DID, and Tracy Strauss on the show created by Tim Kring. Larter's initial character Niki Sanders, was a wife, mother, and a former internet stripper from Las Vegas who exhibits superhuman strength and alternate personalities who go by the names of Jessica and Niki. "Ali read for the part and just owned it from the second she walked in," Kring said to the Chicago Tribune, "It was a very impressive audition." As of the third season, Larter began to play the new character of Tracy Strauss, who possessed the ability to freeze objects; and later, turn her body into water.

Larter took on the title role in Marigold (2007), alongside Salman Khan. The film was released in August 2007 and revolved around an American actress (Larter) who goes to India and gets caught up in the exotic world of Bollywood. Filming took place in North India and London, commencing in June 2004. In an interview with the BBC, Larter remarked this role was "an opportunity to overcome my fear of singing and dancing because I have no professional training [...] I really focused on the character and loved this journey she went on and the experiences she had." She was paid a seven-figure salary for her part in the film.

In 2007, she appeared opposite Milla Jovovich in Resident Evil: Extinction, portraying the character of Claire Redfield, who in the film, is the leader of a convoy of zombie apocalypse survivors who go to Alaska in search of a safe haven. Her role sent her to Mexicali, Mexico for filming from May to late July, and required her hair to be dyed a light red. Larter explained her character Claire: "She became the leader of this convoy. She's incredibly strong, patient. I think she serves a role for everyone within this convoy, let it be a mother to someone, a buddy, a best friend." Despite negative reviews, the film made a total of US$147 million worldwide. Also in the same year, she appeared with Hayes McArthur in the comedy Homo Erectus and appeared as Evelyn Garland in the biographical drama Crazy, based on guitarist Hank Garland.

Larter starred opposite Beyoncé and Idris Elba in the Screen Gems-produced thriller Obsessed (2009). The film follows an office executive (Elba) whose marriage to Knowles' character is threatened by the aggressive interests of a co-worker, portrayed by Larter. In an interview with Glam, Larter said that she "was excited to get the chance to play a femme fatale. I love playing women that are dark and vulnerable and sort of filled with a little bit of crazy emotion." While the film was released to mixed reviews, Larter was critically praised for her performance. Derek Malcolm of The London Evening Standard felt that the movie was a "dim reworking of Fatal Attraction" and noted: "Larter as the pathological minx is the best thing about it." Obsessed opened at top spot in its opening weekend with US$28 million, and made a total domestic gross of US$68 million, becoming Larter's second highest-grossing film in North-America. It resulted in Larter's third Teen Choice Award nomination and an MTV Movie Award for Best Fight with Beyonce.

Larter reprised her role of Claire Redfield in Resident Evil: Afterlife (2010), which was filmed in 3D and saw her character ambushed and mentally manipulated by the fictional Umbrella Corporation, before she is rescued by Alice (Milla Jovovich). Like the previous Resident Evil entries, the film received negative reviews but became a major commercial success, earning US$296 million worldwide. On returning to the role of Claire, she stated in an interview with JoBlo.com: "I guess people liked me as her [...] I'm excited that they brought me back [...] To work with the man [Paul W. S. Anderson] who really created this world and this vision was what excited me about joining this next installment". In 2010, Larter appeared as the title character in a short film for Absolut Vodka entitled "Lemon Drop". Following the release of Afterlife, Larter took a career hiatus to focus on her family.

Return to acting (2014–present)
Larter returned to the big screen playing the love interest of a successful but psychotic man (Matt LeBlanc) in the comedy Lovesick (2014). The film screened at the 15th annual Newport Beach Film Festival and was released for VOD and selected theaters. She portrayed the "fair-weather" friend of a woman with ALS in the independent drama You're Not You (2014), directed by George C. Wolfe and starring Hilary Swank, Emmy Rossum and Josh Duhamel.

In 2014, Larter obtained a regular part in the first season of TNT's drama series Legends, appearing as Crystal Quest, an operative with the FBI's Deep Cover Operations. Larter starred in the supernatural thriller The Diabolical as Madison, a single mother who battles evil forces in her house. Released the following year at South by Southwest, it was distributed for a VOD and limited release in certain parts of United States only. The film received largely mixed reviews; Gary Goldstein of Los Angeles Times felt that her "fraught, more seemingly complex [character] remains underdeveloped" in what he described as a "weak horror-thriller".

Larter starred in Resident Evil: The Final Chapter (2016), where her role of Claire teams up with Alice (Jovovich) and the Red Queen to save the remnants of humanity. Despite a largely mixed critical response, with a worldwide gross of over US$312 million, the film emerged as her biggest box office success. She played the role of Amelia Slater in the Fox series Pitch, about a young black woman who makes history by becoming the first woman to play Major League Baseball. The series ran for one season, which was released in 2016. From 2019 to 2020, Larter played the recurring role of Grace Sawyer in the police procedural series The Rookie.

In the media
Larter first appeared in the media when she portrayed the fictional character of Allegra Coleman in the November 1996 issue of Esquire. The magazine, which billed Coleman as the movies' next dream girl, told of Allegra's relationship with David Schwimmer, how Quentin Tarantino broke up with Mira Sorvino to date her, and how Woody Allen overhauled a film to give her a starring role. When the magazine was published, Esquire received hundreds of phone calls about the non-existent Coleman and various talent agencies sought to represent her, even after the hoax was revealed. Larter herself received a considerable amount of attention after the cover; she received phone calls from morning TV shows and others for interviews.

The Esquire cover led Larter to a role on Varsity Blues. One particular scene where Larter's character, Darcy Sears, wears nothing but whipped cream to cover herself has become a media favorite. It has been referenced a number of times in the media including on MTV's Jersey Shore, where one character refers to it as the "Varsity Blues outfit". Larter has been acknowledged as a Scream queen by MSN due to her appearances in horror/thriller films. After the success of Heroes, Larter appeared on People "Ten Best Dressed List" as "The Newcomer" in 2007. In 2009, Larter was named Cosmopolitan magazine's Fun Fearless Female of the year at a ceremony held in Beverly Hills.

Larter has appeared on the cover of numerous magazines, including Cosmopolitan (France, Indonesia, Ecuador, Germany, Greece, Turkey and U.S.), Glamour, Health, Seventeen, Self, Shape, Maxim, Esquire, Lucky, Allure and Philadelphia Style. She has appeared in print ads and commercials throughout her career. In 2004, she appeared in print ads for Estee Lauder cosmetics. She has appeared in commercials for Parfums de Coeur Designer Imposter Body Sprays and Stolichnaya vodka.

In June 2010, Larter was one of thousands of delegates from 130 countries who participated in a United Nations conference, 'Women Deliver' in Washington, D.C. Larter, along with her husband Hayes MacArthur, hosted The Art of Elysium Gala in 2013 and are to be recipients of the Spirit of Elysium Award at the January 2014 ceremony. She has appeared on the covers of Shape, Cosmopolitan, Allure, Glamour, Lucky, InStyle, Maxim, and Entertainment Weekly.

Personal life
During her time as a model, Larter moved to Los Angeles to pursue acting. In 2002, she moved to New York for a period of three years. In an interview with Phillymag, Larter gave reason for the move: 
In January 2005, she moved back to Los Angeles for a role in Heroes. In December 2007, Larter and her then longtime boyfriend, Hayes MacArthur, were engaged to marry. They had met on the set of National Lampoon's Homo Erectus. In a 2007 interview with Cosmo, Larter said: "I told my boyfriend after three weeks that I wanted to marry him and that we could do it tomorrow." On August 1, 2009, Larter married MacArthur at MacArthur's parents' estate in Kennebunkport, Maine; among the invited was Larter's close friend Amy Smart. The couple later purchased a three-story home in the Hollywood Hills for $2.9 million.

On July 20, 2010, Larter announced that she and MacArthur were expecting their first child and later, on the September 10 episode of Late Night with Jimmy Fallon, announced that she was expecting a boy. Larter gave birth to the couple's son, Theodore Hayes MacArthur, on December 20, 2010. In August 2014, Larter confirmed that she and MacArthur were expecting their second child that winter. She gave birth to a girl named Vivienne Margaret on January 15, 2015. Larter has two dogs, Jackpot and Ella.

Filmography

Film

Television

Awards and nominations

References

Further reading
 Wolf, Jeanne. Ali Larter, Always the Bad Girl. Parade Magazine. August 24, 2009. Retrieved July 24, 2010.
 Cavaco, Paul. Ali Larter: Her Allure Photo Shoot. Allure. Retrieved July 24, 2010.
 Our Heroine. Cosmopolitan. Retrieved July 24, 2010.
 Hiltbrand, David. Split personalities make solid role for Ali Larter. Chicago Tribune. January 31, 2007. Retrieved July 24, 2010.
 Longsdorf, Amy. 'Obsessed' star Ali Larter calls Allentown area a 'safe haven' . The Morning Call. April 26, 2009. Retrieved July 26, 2010.
 Passafuime, Rocco. Still Our Hottest Hero. The Cinema Source. September 18, 2010. Retrieved September 25, 2010.

External links

 
 
 
 

1976 births
Actresses from New Jersey
American film actresses
Female models from New Jersey
American television actresses
Living people
Cherry Hill High School West alumni
People from Cherry Hill, New Jersey
20th-century American actresses
21st-century American actresses